Sudden Burst of Energy is a smooth jazz studio album by Earl Klugh released in 1996. In this release, Klugh is "joined by a large rhythm section plus an occasional saxophonist".

Track listing 
All tracks composed by Earl Klugh
"Happy Song" - 4:44
"Maybe Tonight" - 4:02
"Sunset Island" - 4:24
"I'll Be Waiting" - 4:46
"The Wiggle" - 6:04
"By the Sea" - 4:25
"Only You" - 4:13
"Slow Boat to Rio" - 4:10
"I'll Be Waiting (Reprise)" - 2:11
"Till the End of Time" - 4:48
"Open Road" - 4:27

Charts

References 

1996 albums
Earl Klugh albums
Warner Records albums